Mount Carmel Historic District is a national historic district located at Mount Carmel, McCormick County, South Carolina.  The district encompasses 40 contributing buildings in Mount Carmel.  They were built between 1885 and 1920, and include residential, commercial, institutional, religious, and industrial buildings.  Notable buildings include Baker's Store (c. 1890), John Cade House (c. 1890), John W. Morrah House (1896), and the Mount Carmel Presbyterian Church (c. 1886).

It was listed on the National Register of Historic Places in 1982.

References

Historic districts on the National Register of Historic Places in South Carolina
Buildings and structures in McCormick County, South Carolina
National Register of Historic Places in McCormick County, South Carolina